Denislav Kharalamiev Kalchev (born 1 July 1973 in Silistra) is a retired butterfly and medley swimmer from Bulgaria. He was a member of the Bulgarian National Swimming Team (four men and one woman) at the 1992 Summer Olympics in Barcelona, Spain, where he didn't reach the finals in his three individual starts. He also competed at the 1996 Summer Olympics in Atlanta, Georgia.

References

External links
 
 
 

1973 births
Living people
Male butterfly swimmers
Male medley swimmers
Bulgarian male swimmers
Olympic swimmers of Bulgaria
Swimmers at the 1992 Summer Olympics
Swimmers at the 1996 Summer Olympics
People from Silistra